Choi Kwok-wai, also known as Frankie Choi (born 28 August 1973), is a Hong Kong ATV actor, most notable for his role as Bill in the film Moments of Love.

Filmography
Memento (2002)
Moments of Love (2005)
a料 (2007)
a+料 (2007)

External links
Frankie Choi's profile on ATV (Traditional Chinese)

Hong Kong male actors
Living people
1973 births